Nico Empen (born 11 January 1996) is a German footballer who plays as a centre-forward for Regionalliga Nord club Weiche Flensburg.

References

External links
 

People from Husum
1996 births
Living people
Association football forwards
German footballers
Footballers from Schleswig-Holstein
Germany youth international footballers
FC St. Pauli players
SC Weiche Flensburg 08 players
SV Rödinghausen players
Regionalliga players
2. Bundesliga players